The featherweight class in the boxing at the 1996 Summer Olympics competition was the fourth-lightest class at the 1996 Summer Olympics in Atlanta, Georgia. The competition in the Alexander Memorial Coliseum started on 1996-07-20 and ended on 1996-08-04. There was significant controversy surrounding judging of the fight between 19-year-old Floyd Mayweather of the United States and 27-year-old two-time Olympian Serafim Todorov of Bulgaria, with Todorov being awarded the semi-final bout which, according to many observers, was won by Mayweather. The U.S. team filed a protest over the Mayweather bout, claiming the judges were intimidated by Bulgaria's Emil Jetchev (head of the boxing officials) into favoring the Bulgarian Todorov, but it was rejected.

Medalists

Results

References

External links
amateur-boxing

Featherweight